44 The Shambles is an historic building in the English city of York, North Yorkshire. A Grade II* listed building, part of the structure dates to the late 15th century, with an extension added the following century. It was refronted in the late 18th century, followed by another alteration in the 19th century, when a shopfront was added. It was renovated in 1954.

As of 2023, the building is occupied by Ye Old Shambles Tavern.

References 

44
Houses in North Yorkshire
Buildings and structures in North Yorkshire
15th-century establishments in England
Grade II* listed buildings in York
Grade II* listed houses
15th century in York